Sir Hugh Rose Island, or Rose Island, sometimes called Little Neill Island, is an uninhabited island of the Andaman Islands.  It belongs to the South Andaman administrative district, part of the Indian union territory of Andaman and Nicobar Islands.

Etymology
Rose is named after Field marshal Hugh Rose.

History
The lighthouse is situated on a hillock. There are 70 masonry steps to reach the tower. The Lighthouse is an unattended station. A rainwater tank and a restroom have been provided for the maintenance staff.
A third order revolving optic, on a mercury trough  with DA (dissolved acetylene)  gas burner and gas motor to revolve the optic, all supplied by M/s BBT, Paris were installed inside the lantern house over the CI tower . The light was commissioned on 14 April 1969. Due to frequent failures of the rotation system, the revolving optic assembly was removed and a  cut-and-polished drum optic was placed in position in 1978. The DA gas burner was replaced by a  DA gas flasher with a sun valve. This reduced the consumption of DA gas but the intensity of the light went down.

With the shortage in the supply of DA gas, it became essential to change over to solar energy. Accordingly, the light source was replaced by 12V 100W Halogen lamp inside the same optic and on the same pedestal. The system became operational on  18 October 1993.

Geography
It is locally known as 'Chhota' Neil (‘Little’ Neil).

Administration
Politically, Rose Island is part of Port Blair Taluk.

Demographics 
The island is uninhabited.

Image gallery

References 

Ritchie's Archipelago
Islands of South Andaman district
Islands of the Andaman Sea
Uninhabited islands of India
Islands of India
Islands of the Bay of Bengal